Cymenopterus is a genus of beetles in the family Carabidae, containing the following species:

 Cymenopterus perforatus (Alluaud, 1897)
 Cymenopterus vadoni (Jeannel, 1948)

References

Platyninae